The 2018–19 Rice Owls men's basketball team represented Rice University during the 2018–19 NCAA Division I men's basketball season. The Owls, led by second-year head coach Scott Pera, played their home games at Tudor Fieldhouse in Houston, Texas as members of Conference USA.

Previous season
The Owls finished the 2017–18 season 7–24, 4–14 in C-USA play to finish in 13th place and failed to qualify for the C-USA tournament.

Offseason

Departures

Incoming transfers

2018 recruiting class

2019 recruiting class

Roster

Schedule and results

|-
!colspan=9 style=|Exhibition

|-
!colspan=9 style=|Non-conference regular season

|-
!colspan=12 style=|Conference USA regular season

|-
!colspan=12 style=| Conference USA tournament

Source

See also
2018–19 Rice Owls women's basketball team

References

Rice Owls men's basketball seasons
Rice